Phenom is an American sitcom about a tennis wunderkind that aired on ABC from September 14, 1993 to May 10, 1994. The series stars Angela Goethals, Judith Light, and William Devane.

Phenom was placed in the time slot of Tuesdays at 8:30/7:30c, between Full House and Roseanne. The series did well in the ratings, ranking in the Top 20 and maintaining 95% of its Full House lead-in. ABC cancelled the show after one season and replaced it with Me and the Boys, which was also cancelled after one season.

Synopsis
Fifteen-year-old Angela Doolan (Goethals) has the potential to be a sports superstar but worries about losing her normality and severing her family ties. Angela's father has deserted the family to rediscover his youth and dally with younger women, leaving her mother Dianne (Light) to raise her children (including older son Brian and youngest daughter Mary Margaret) and try to keep a lid on her bitterness. Added to the fray is Angela's obsessive tennis coach Lou (Devane), who is determined to bring out the champion in Angela regardless of the cost to her growth as a person.

Cast

Main cast
Angela Goethals – Angela Doolan
Judith Light – Dianne Doolan
Ashley Johnson – Mary Margaret Doolan
Todd Louiso – Brian Doolan
William Devane – Lou Della Rosa (uncredited)
Jennifer Lien – Roanne

Recurring cast
Sara Rue – Monica
Randy Josselyn – Jesse
Beverley Mitchell – Clara
Marianne Muellerleile – Sister Felicia
Debra Jo Rupp – Sister Mary Incarnata
John Christian Graas – Tony Lenchenko

Production notes
The series was created by Dick Blasucci, Marc Flanagan, and Sam Simon. Blasucci also served as executive producer of the series, alongside Emmy Award-winner James L. Brooks and Danny Kallis, who previously worked alongside Judith Light as a writer/producer on Who's The Boss?

Despite being one of the show's main stars, William Devane did not receive on-screen credit in any of the episodes. Devane was originally slated to get second billing in the cast, between Judith Light and Angela Goethals. He reportedly fought to have top billing, or at least shared top billing with Light, in response to his Knots Landing fame. Both the producers and ABC refused to move Devane's billing, believing that Judith Light having sole first billing would draw in more of the female 18-49 demographic that is attractive to advertisers and would bring back ABC viewers who had made Light's previous series, Who's the Boss?, a success. Devane ultimately told the producers that if he couldn't get a billing change, he would rather not be credited at all.

Phenom's theme song, "The Promise and the Prize," was written and performed by Carly Simon. Two versions of the song were used during the program's run, a one-minute version as well as a 30-second version that appeared in select episodes that ran over their allotted time. U.S. Open women's singles and Wimbledon mixed doubles champion Tracy Austin served as the technical consultant for the series. (Austin also appeared in a cameo in the series' pilot episode.)

Episodes

Awards and nominations

References

External links
 
 

1993 American television series debuts
1994 American television series endings
1990s American sitcoms
American sports television series
English-language television shows
Television series by Gracie Films
Television series by Sony Pictures Television
Television shows set in Los Angeles